Benrubi SA is a Greek manufacturing company of household appliances, such a retailing company (under the name "Mega Outlet").

It was established in 1880 in Thessaloniki. The company has industrial facilities in Kalochori, Thessaloniki and in Boeotia.

References

External links
official site

Companies listed on the Athens Exchange
Companies based in Athens
Companies based in Thessaloniki
Greek brands
Home appliance manufacturers of Greece
Retail companies of Greece
Greek companies established in the 19th century